The Bilsam Ultra Cruiser is a family of Polish microlight aircraft designed and produced by Bilsam Aviation of Poznań, introduced in the 2000s. The aircraft is supplied as a complete ready-to-fly-aircraft, as a kit and in the form of plans for amateur construction.

The manufacturer's website is non-functional and has been so since about 2008, so it is not clear if the company is still in business.

Design and development

The Ultra Cruiser I features a cantilever high-wing, a single-seat enclosed cockpit under a bubble canopy, fixed tricycle landing gear and a single engine in pusher configuration.

The aircraft is made from composite material. The standard engines used are the  Hirth F-33 two-stroke or the Bilsam TNA 650  Suzuki automotive conversion powerplant.

Variants
Ultra Cruiser I
Single-seat version
Ultra Cruiser II
Two-seat version

Specifications (Ultra Cruiser I)

References

External links

Ultra Cruiser
2000s Polish sport aircraft
2000s Polish ultralight aircraft
2000s Polish civil utility aircraft
Single-engined pusher aircraft
High-wing aircraft
Homebuilt aircraft